Harry Charles Smith (1894–unknown) was an English footballer who played in the Football League for Northampton Town.

References

1894 births
English footballers
Association football goalkeepers
English Football League players
Northampton Town F.C. players
People from Northamptonshire (before 1974)
Year of death missing